A number of vessels of the People's Liberation Army Navy have borne the name Changsha, after the capital Changsha.

 , a Type 053H frigate, in service in 1975 until 2018. Later renamed to Jiujiang in 1981.
, a Type 051 destroyer, in service in 1973. Possibly decommissioned.
 , a Type 052D destroyer, in service since 2015.

References 

People's Liberation Army Navy ship names